Bruce Brown Jr. (born August 15, 1996) is an American professional basketball player for the Denver Nuggets of the National Basketball Association (NBA). He played college basketball for the Miami Hurricanes and was selected 42nd overall by the Detroit Pistons in the 2018 NBA draft. He played High School basketball at Wakefield Memorial High School, and later Vermont Academy.

High school career
Brown played basketball and football for Wakefield Memorial High School in Wakefield, Massachusetts. For his junior season, he transferred to Vermont Academy in Saxtons River, Vermont. As a senior, Brown led his team to the New England Preparatory School Athletic Council Class AA title and was named tournament most valuable player. He was selected to play in the 2016 Jordan Brand Classic. Brown was considered a five-star recruit by 247Sports and ESPN and a four-star recruit by Rivals. Brown was ranked no. 26 overall recruit and fifth best shooting guard in the 2016 high school class. On November 18, 2015, he committed to play college basketball for Miami (FL) over an offer from Indiana, among others.

College career
As a sophomore with the Miami Hurricanes, Brown averaged 11.4 points, 7.1 rebounds, and four assists per game and shot 27 percent from 3-point range. He only played 19 games and missed the postseason with a left foot injury that required surgery. After the season Brown declared for the 2018 NBA draft but did not hire an agent, thereby allowing for the possibility of returning to college. He ultimately decided to stay in the draft.

Professional career

Detroit Pistons (2018–2020)
On June 21, 2018, Brown was drafted 42nd overall by the Detroit Pistons in the 2018 NBA draft. Brown made his NBA debut on October 17, 2018 against the Brooklyn Nets, scoring no points with two rebounds and an assist in 19 minutes of action. On November 2, 2019, he posted 22 points and seven assists, with no turnovers, in a 113–109 win over the Nets. On February 2, 2020, Brown recorded 19 points, 10 rebounds and eight assists in a 128–123 overtime victory over the Denver Nuggets.

Brooklyn Nets (2020–2022)
On November 19, 2020, Brown was traded to the Brooklyn Nets in a three-team trade.

On February 23, 2021, Brown scored a career-high 29 points in the Nets' 127–118 win against the Sacramento Kings.

On April 23, 2022, he scored a team leading 26 points for the Nets in a losing effort against the Celtics in the first round of the NBA playoffs. The Nets fell to 0-3 after that game. His performance in Games 2 and 3 were notably impressive, as he scored 23 or more points in both contests, despite eclipsing 20 points only 4 times throughout the entire regular season.

Denver Nuggets (2022–present)
On July 7, 2022, Brown signed with the Denver Nuggets. On November 24, Brown recorded a triple double with 17 points, 13 rebounds, and 10 assists during a win against the Oklahoma City Thunder.

Career statistics

NBA

Regular season

|-
| style="text-align:left;"|
| style="text-align:left;"|Detroit
| 74 || 56 || 19.6 || .398 || .258 || .750 || 2.5 || 1.2 || .5 || .5 || 4.3
|-
| style="text-align:left;"|
| style="text-align:left;"|Detroit
| 56 || 43 || 28.2 || .443 || .344 || .739 || 4.7 || 4.0 || 1.1 || .5 || 8.9
|-
| style="text-align:left;"|
| style="text-align:left;"|Brooklyn
| 65 || 37 || 22.3 || .556 || .288 || .735 || 5.4 || 1.6 || .9 || .4 || 8.8
|-
| style="text-align:left;"|
| style="text-align:left;"|Brooklyn
| 72 || 45 || 24.6 || .506 || .404 || .758 || 4.8 || 2.1 || 1.1 || .7 || 9.0
|- class="sortbottom"
| style="text-align:center;" colspan="2"|Career
| 269 || 181 || 23.4 || .482 || .327 || .745 || 4.3 || 2.1 || .9 || .5 || 7.6

Playoffs

|-
| style="text-align:left;"|2019
| style="text-align:left;"|Detroit
| 4 || 2 || 14.3 || .357 || .200 || 1.000 || 2.0 || .5 || .5 || .3 || 3.3
|-
| style="text-align:left;"|2021
| style="text-align:left;"|Brooklyn
| 12 || 5 || 23.1 || .506 || .182 || .813 || 5.1 || 2.1 || .7 || .4 || 7.9
|-
| style="text-align:left;"|2022
| style="text-align:left;"|Brooklyn
| 4 || 4 || 34.8 || .568 || .429 || .800 || 4.8 || 2.8 || 1.3 || .8 || 14.0
|- class="sortbottom"
| style="text-align:center;" colspan="2"|Career
| 20 || 7 || 23.7 || .508 || .300 || .821 || 4.4 || 1.9 || .8 || .5 || 8.2

College

|-
| style="text-align:left;"|2016–17
| style="text-align:left;"|Miami
| 33 || 29 || 31.9 || .459 || .347 || .744 || 5.6 || 3.2 || 1.5 || .5 || 11.8
|-
| style="text-align:left;"|2017–18
| style="text-align:left;"|Miami
| 19 || 19 || 33.7 || .415 || .267 || .629 || 7.1 || 4.0 || 1.3 || .8 || 11.4
|- class="sortbottom"
| style="text-align:center;" colspan="2"|Career
| 52 || 48 || 32.6 || .442 || .316 || .702 || 6.2 || 3.5 || 1.4 || .6 || 11.7

References

External links

 Miami Hurricanes bio
 ESPN profile

1996 births
Living people
21st-century African-American sportspeople
African-American basketball players
American men's basketball players
Basketball players from Boston
Brooklyn Nets players
Denver Nuggets players
Detroit Pistons draft picks
Detroit Pistons players
Miami Hurricanes men's basketball players
Shooting guards
Vermont Academy alumni